Soleb is an ancient town in Nubia, in present-day Sudan. The site is located north of the third 
cataract of the Nile, on the western side of the Nile. It was discovered and described by 
Karl Richard Lepsius in 1844.

Necropolis
Soleb is also the location of a vast necropolis with small tomb chapels decorated with pyramids. The earliest 
royal tombs date to the 18th dynasty, whereas some belong to the 
Ramesside and Meroitic periods.

Amarna Period
During the Amarna Period (Mid 18th Dynasty), several pharaohs attended to Soleb, such as Amenhotep III, 
Akhenaten, Tutankhamun, and Ay.

Amenhotep III
A large temple made of sandstone was founded here by Amenhotep III. It is the southernmost temple currently 
known to have been built by this pharaoh. The temple was consecrated to the deity Amun Re and to the pharaoh 
depicted deified with ram-horns. The architect may have been Amenhotep, son of Hapu.

At Sedeinga, a companion temple was built by Amenhotep III to Queen Tiye as a manifestation of the Eye of Ra.

The so-called Prudhoe Lions originally stood as guardian figures at this temple inscribed with the name of Amenhotep 
III. They depict a lioness, as symbols of Sekhmet, a major deity who protected the pharaohs.

Akhenaten

During the reign of Akhenaten, he initially is shown worshipping his father and Amen at the temple. But later, 
he re-dedicates the temple to Aten.

Tutankhamen
During the reign of Tutankhamen, the religious reforms of his father (Akhenaten) were reversed and re-dedicated 
the temple to Amen-Ra. He finished the second granite lion and inscribed his name on the Prudhoe Lions.

Ay
During the reign of Ay, he also inscribed his name on the Prudhoe Lions.

Gallery

References

Further reading
 David O'Connor, Eric H. Cline (Editor): Amenhotep III: Perspectives on His Reign, University of Michigan Press, October 2001, Paperback. 
 Joann Fletcher: Chronicle of a Pharaoh: The Intimate Life of Amenhotep III, Oxford University Press, USA, November 2000. 
 The Art and Archaeology of Ancient Nubia by Peter Lacovara

History of Nubia
Archaeological sites in Sudan